The 1958 Oklahoma gubernatorial election was held on November 4, 1958, and was a race for Governor of Oklahoma. Democrat  J. Howard Edmondson defeated Republican Phil Ferguson and Independent D. A. 'Jelly' Bryce.

Results

References

1958
Gubernatorial
Oklahoma
November 1958 events in the United States